Turf Paradise is a thoroughbred and quarter horse racetrack located at 19th Avenue and Bell Road, in the Deer Valley section of Phoenix, Arizona in the United States. It opened in 1956. It is owned and operated by local entrepreneur Jerry Simms. 

Turf Paradise is typically open for racing from early November through April. It is widely known as the home of the Turf Paradise Derby in February, an official prep race for the Kentucky Derby.

History
In 1954 businessman Walter Cluer, a successful millwork company founder and manufacturer from Phoenix, purchased  of barren desert at what is now Bell Road and 19th Avenue. Cluer, who was also a horse owner, dreamt of building a first-class race track in Phoenix.

However, he forged ahead and on January 7, 1956, Turf Paradise opened its doors to great success. Cluer remained as head of the track for nearly 25 years.

In 1980, Herb Owens took over and Turf Paradise entered into a phase of renovation. A seven-furlong infield turf course with a one-mile and one-eighth (1.8 km) chute was added. The Clubhouse was enlarged and a Turf Club with penthouse-style Directors’ Suite and outdoor patio was also added.

Turf Paradise's third owner, Robert Walker of Scottsdale, Arizona, had made a fortune with an aerospace company he had founded and sold. He purchased the track in 1989 and moved it into the gambling field of off-track betting. Walker's formula seemed to be the right approach at the right time, as he retired the track's outstanding debt and declared the first-ever dividend for Turf Paradise stockholders. In addition, Walker and a consortium of horse racing interests successfully lobbied the Arizona Legislature to legalize off track betting (OTB). The in-state OTB network is perhaps Walker's most significant contribution to the track and Arizona's racing industry. What started out as a single OTB site in little Cave Creek (population 4,000) in 1991, has now grown to over 45 in-state OTBs and over 900 out-of-state locales, located in six countries.

Turf Paradise took on a corporate face in 1994 when the track was purchased in a stock acquisition by California-based Hollywood Park Racetrack under the chairmanship of Randall D. Hubbard. Despite intense competition from a number of Native American in-state casino gaming interests, Turf Paradise continued to flourish and achieve record mutual handle numbers.

The new millennium provided Turf Paradise with a new owner in the person of Jerry Simms. The self-made multi-millionaire purchased Turf Paradise on June 16, 2000 for $53 million. Simms immediately set out a $5 million renovation plan. Both the Clubhouse and Turf Club were completely renovated and re-styled. Two race book-style betting carrels, of 80 private terminals each, were added, one in the Clubhouse and the other adjacent to the Turf Club.

Simms also had the main track and turf course renovated, and in the summer of 2003, Simms built a $125,000 equine swimming pool in the stable area of the race track. The  by  pool provides advanced horse therapy for more than 2,200 thoroughbreds stabled on the backside. The pool had an immediate effect, not only on equine health but on field size.

The track was on a healthy financial footing in 2004, and Simms purchased property at the busy 19th Avenue and Bell Road intersection adjacent to the race track. He made use of the land for commercial development and at the same time enhancing the racing operation.

In mid-March 2020, the meet ended early as the COVID-19 pandemic caused the track to shut down indefinitely.

Racing returned on January 4, 2021 with an 84-day race meet judged to be one of the most successful at the track in recent times. Pending finalization of contracts with the AZHBPA, racing is due to resume for a 125-day live meet on November 5, 2021.

Physical attributes
The track has a one-mile (1.6 km) dirt oval and a seven furlong turf oval.

Racing
The following notable stakes are run at Turf Paradise:
 Turf Paradise Derby
 Phoenix Gold Cup Handicap
 Cotton Fitzsimmons Mile Handicap

References

External links
 

Horse racing venues in Arizona
Sports in Phoenix, Arizona
Sports venues in Phoenix, Arizona
1956 establishments in Arizona